Melissa St. Vil (born September 8, 1983) is an American professional boxer. She has challenged twice for world titles; the WBC super featherweight title in 2018 and the WBC lightweight title in March 2019.

Professional career
On 31 July 2009, she beat Jennifer Han who was a former World Combat League fighter, IKF Amateur Tournament Champion, and a Four-Time National Boxing Champion (Golden Gloves and USA Boxing).

She later captured the vacant WBC Silver super featherweight title on 16 April 2016 by defeating Baby Nansen and has since defended it twice.

Personal life
Melissa was assaulted by Roger Mayweather, Floyd Mayweather Jr.'s trainer and uncle. She was rushed by ambulance to Mountain View Hospital and was treated for injuries consistent with strangulation and later released. Roger Mayweather was arrested and charged with 2 felonies. The first count for coercion force, the second count for battery with strangulation.

Professional boxing record

Titles
WIBA super featherweight title (130 Ibs)
IWBF  welterweight title (147 Ibs)
WBC Silver female super featherweight title (130 Ibs)
IBU super featherweight title

References

External links

American women boxers
American sportspeople of Haitian descent
Boxers from New York (state)
People from Central Islip, New York
Lightweight boxers
1983 births
Living people
Boxers managed by Brian Cohen